USS Peacock may refer to the following ships of the United States Navy:

 , a 500-ton sloop-of-war
 , a 650-ton sloop-of-war
 , a World War I minesweeper launched 8 April 1919; sank after collision with another ship
 , a minesweeper

United States Navy ship names